Joop van Oosterom (12 December 1937 – 22 October 2016) was a Dutch billionaire, chess and billiards sponsor, and twice correspondence chess world champion. His fortune, made with the Volmac Software Group, was estimated by Dutch financial magazine Quote at €1.1 billion at the time of his death.

From 1992 to 2011 he staged the annual Melody Amber chess tournament in Monaco, where world-class Grandmasters played rapid and blindfold games. It is named after his first daughter Melody Amber. His other daughter was the eponym to the Crystal Kelly Cup, an invitational tournament for three-cushion carom billiards, which has been held between 1994 and 2011 mostly in Monte Carlo and Nice.

Van Oosterom was a strong correspondence chess player, but suffered a severe brain haemorrhage in 1993. Nevertheless, he concluded the world correspondence chess championship successfully and became the 18th World Champion in Correspondence Chess in 2005. This achievement, however, has been criticized, as at the time of the championship van Oosterom had hired the strong grandmaster Jeroen Piket as his personal secretary. Earlier, van Oosterom had had two Dutch International Masters on his payroll whose job was to analyse his correspondence games.
Chess author Tim Krabbé wrote: "The Turk was operated by William Schlumberger, Mephisto was operated by Isidore Gunsberg, Ajeeb was operated by Harry Pillsbury and Joop van Oosterom is operated by Jeroen Piket."
Van Oosterom also won the 21st World Championship Final in Correspondence Chess in 2008.

In February 2017 it was announced that van Oosterom had died in October 2016. No cause of death was announced and it is not clear why it was kept secret.

References

External links
 

1937 births
2016 deaths
World Correspondence Chess Champions
Correspondence chess grandmasters
Dutch chess players
People from Hilversum
Chess patrons
Dutch billionaires
20th-century philanthropists